Jake Briningstool (born December 9, 2002) is an American football tight end for the Clemson Tigers.

Early life and high school
Briningstool grew up in Brentwood, Tennessee and attended Ravenwood High School. He caught 39 passes for 774 yards and 12 touchdowns as a senior. Briningstool was rated a four-star recruit and committed to play college football at Clemson.

College career
Briningstool joined the Clemson Tigers as an early enrollee. He played in eight games as a freshman and caught three passes for 67 yards. Briningstool entered his sophomore season as the Tigers' second tight end.

References

External links
Clemson Tigers bio

Living people
American football tight ends
Clemson Tigers football players
Players of American football from Tennessee
Year of birth missing (living people)